This is a List of White Sea species, ordered by suspected phylum.

?Incertae sedis
3 species

Phylum ?Arthropoda
1 species

Phylum ?Cnidaria
1 species

Erniettomorphs
1 species

Phylum ?Mollusca
1 species

Phylum ?Porifera
1 species.

Phylum Proarticulata
3 species

Phylum Rangeomorpha
3 species

Phylum Trilobozoa
1 species

Alphabetical listing

Bomakellia
Bonata septata
Cephalonega
Charniodiscus
Chondroplon
Cyclomedusa
Dickinsonia
Inaria

Kimberella
Palaeophragmodictya
Parvancorina
Pteridinium
Tamga (Genus)
Tribrachidium
Vaveliksia
Yorgia

See also
Vendia
Odontogriphus

White Sea

White Sea
Ediacaran life